Summer and Sinners (Swedish: Sommar och syndare) is a 1960 Swedish comedy film directed by Arne Mattsson and starring Karl-Arne Holmsten, Elsa Prawitz and Yvonne Lombard. The film's sets were designed by the art director Bibi Lindström. It was shot in Eastmancolor. The film received a very poor reception, and even some of its own cast members were publicly critical. This marked a turning point in the previously high regard in which Mattsson's films were received.

Cast
 Karl-Arne Holmsten as Emil Horneberg
 Elsa Prawitz as Helga Krus
 Olof Thunberg as Ove Högsbo
 Yvonne Lombard as Heidi Horneberg
 Gio Petré as Liselotte Högsbo
 Yngve Gamlin as Prof. Cornelius
 Lena Granhagen as Mrs. Zitter
 Nils Hallberg as Åke Johansson
 Sture Lagerwall as Sven Molmagen
 Dirch Passer as Kansas Joe
 Sif Ruud as Ms. Prytz

References

Bibliography 
 Björklund, Elisabet & Larsson, Mariah. Swedish Cinema and the Sexual Revolution: Critical Essays. McFarland, 2016.
 Qvist, Per Olov & von Bagh, Peter. Guide to the Cinema of Sweden and Finland. Greenwood Publishing Group, 2000.

External links

1960 films
1960s Swedish-language films
Films directed by Arne Mattsson
Swedish comedy films
1960 comedy films
1960s Swedish films